New York’s 1st congressional district is a congressional district for the United States House of Representatives in eastern Long Island. It includes the eastern two-thirds of Suffolk County, including the northern portion of Brookhaven, as well as the entirety of the towns of Huntington, Smithtown, Riverhead, Southold, Southampton, East Hampton, and Shelter Island.  The district encompasses extremely wealthy enclaves such as the Hamptons, middle class suburban towns such as Selden, Centereach and Lake Grove, working-class towns such as  Riverhead and rural farming communities such as Mattituck and Jamesport on the North Fork. The district currently is represented by Republican Nick LaLota.

The district has been a swing district since the 1990s and a Republican-leaning seat since the 2010s. President George W. Bush defeated challenger John Kerry by less than a percentage point in 2004, while in 2008 and 2012, Barack Obama won the district by less than 5 points. In 2012, New York underwent redistricting, and the 1st district was slightly modified. In the 2014 election, Republican Lee Zeldin defeated Democratic incumbent Tim Bishop, who had represented the district since 2003. Donald Trump won the district by 12 percentage points over Hillary Clinton in the 2016 presidential election. At the same time, Zeldin won a second term, defeating Democratic challenger Anna-Thone Holst by a margin of 15.6%, the largest margin of victory for a Republican since 1998. In 2018, Zeldin won re-election to a third term, narrowly defeating Democratic challenger Perry Gershon by 4.1%. In 2020, the district shifted back in the Democratic direction, with Trump carrying the district by only four points in the 2020 United States presidential election.

In 2022, Republican Nick LaLota defeated Democrat Bridget Fleming in the newly-redrawn district by an approximately ten-point margin. As a result, it was one of 18 districts that voted for Joe Biden in the 2020 presidential election while being won or held by a Republican in 2022.

Recent election results in statewide races

Communities within the district

 Amagansett
 Aquebogue
 Asharoken
 Baiting Hollow
 Belle Terre
 Bridgehampton
 Brookhaven
 Calverton
 Centereach
 Centreport
 Cherry Grove
 Cold Spring Harbor
 Commack
 Coram
 Chutchogue
 Dering Harbor
 Dix Hills
 East Hampton
 East Hampton (village)
 East Hampton North
 East Marion
 East Northport
 East Patchogue
 Eastport
 East Quogue
 East Setauket
 East Shoreham
 East Yaphank
 Eatons Neck
 Elwood
 Farmingville
 Fishers Island
 Flanders
 Fort Salonga
 Gordon Heights
 Greenlawn
 Greenport
 Greenport West
 Hagerman
 Halesite
 Hampton Bays
 Hauppauge
 Head of the Harbor
 Holbrook
 Holtsville
 Huntington
 Huntington (hamlet)
 Huntington Bay
 Huntington Station
 Jamesport
 Kings Park
 Lake Grove
 Lake Ronkonkoma
 Laurel
 Lloyd Harbor
 Manorville
 Mattituck
 Melville
 Middle Island
 Miller Place
 Montauk
 Mount Sinai
 Napeague
 New Suffolk
 North Haven
 Northampton
 Northville
 Northwest Harbor
 Nesconset
 Nissequogue
 Northport
 North Sea
 Noyack
 Ocean Bay Park
 Old Field
 Orient
 Patchogue
 Peconic
 Point O'Woods
 Poquott
 Port Jefferson
 Port Jefferson Station
 Quiogue
 Quogue
 Remsenberg
 Ridge
 Riverhead
 Riverhead (hamlet)
 Riverside
 Rocky Point
 Ronkonkoma
 Sag Harbor
 Sagaponack
 San Remo
 Selden
 Setauket
 Shelter Island
 Shelter Island (hamlet
 Shelter Island Heights
 Shinnecock Hills
 Shoreham
 Smithtown
 Smithtown (hamlet)
 Sound Beach
 Southhampton
 Southampton (village)
 South Haven
 Southold
 Southold
 South Huntington
 South Jamesport
 Speonk
 Springs
 St. James
 Stony Brook
 Strongs Neck
 Tuckahoe
 Upton
 Vernon Valley
 Village of the Branch
 Wading River
 Wainscott
 Water Island
 Water Mill
 Westhampton
 Westhampton Beach
 West Hampton Dunes
 West Hills
 West Manor
 Wincoma
 Yaphank

Components: past and present
1823–1945:
All of Suffolk, Nassau
Parts of Queens

1945–1963:
All of Suffolk
Parts of Nassau

1963–Present:
Parts of Suffolk

List of members representing the district

1789–1813: one seat

1813–1823: two seats
From 1809 to 1823, two seats were apportioned, elected at-large on a general ticket.

1823–Present: one seat

Recent election results 

Note that in New York State electoral politics there are numerous minor parties at various points on the political spectrum. Certain parties will invariably endorse either the Republican or Democratic candidate for every office, hence the state electoral results contain both the party votes, and the final candidate votes (Listed as "Recap").

See also

 List of United States congressional districts
 New York's congressional districts
 United States congressional delegations from New York

Notes

References

 
 
 
 Congressional Biographical Directory of the United States 1774–present
 National atlas congressional maps
 

01
Suffolk County, New York
Constituencies established in 1789
1789 establishments in New York (state)